Windsor Plantation (also known as Little Edisto Plantation and Ashwood Plantation) is a historic house on Russell Creek on Edisto Island, South Carolina.

The Windsor Plantation house was constructed about 1857 as a wedding gift to a son of Edward Whaley. The large clapboard house is a good example of a Georgian-inspired sea island cotton plantation. The house was listed on the National Register of Historic Places on  July 23, 1974.

References

Houses on the National Register of Historic Places in South Carolina
Georgian architecture in South Carolina
Houses completed in 1857
National Register of Historic Places in Charleston County, South Carolina
Houses in Charleston County, South Carolina
1857 establishments in South Carolina